Volt Austria (short name: Volt) is a political party in Austria and the Austrian chapter of Volt Europa a progressive and Eurofederalist pan-European political party and movement.

History 
Volt Austria has been registered as a party since October 12, 2018 with the aim of contesting the European elections 2019. However, the around 100 members (April 2019) did not manage to collect the necessary 2600 declarations of support for a candidacy. Thus, Volt was not eligible to run in the European elections in Austria.

Elections

2020 
Volt Austria contested the municipal council and state parliament elections in Vienna 2020 in two of the 23 electoral districts and received 102 votes, which corresponds to 0.01% of the vote across Vienna. In the 2020 district representation election in Vienna, the party contested the 2nd to 10th districts and the 21st district and received 621 votes, equivalent to 0.08% of the vote across Vienna.

2021 
In 2021, the party contested the city council election in Linz, and received 112 votes (0.12%).

Structure 
The party is organized in local and regional teams and active in Upper Austria, Salzburg, Styria, Tyrol, Vorarlbeg and Vienna.

External links 

 Official website

References 

Austria
Pro-European political parties in Austria
Political parties in Austria
2018 establishments in Austria
Political parties established in 2018